Chainani is a surname. Notable people with the surname include:

Hashmatrai Khubchand Chainani (1904–1965), Indian judge
Soman Chainani, American author and filmmaker

Indian surnames